I-GO was a Chicago-based car sharing organization which is owned by Enterprise Holdings. It was established in 2002 by the Center for Neighborhood Technology as an independent 501(c)(3) not-for-profit organization working in the fields of urban livability and sustainability. I-GO was sold to Enterprise Holdings in May 2013 and re-branded as Enterprise CarShare.

Stated mission 
I-GO’s stated mission was to reduce car ownership rates, decrease transportation costs, reduce urban congestion, and improve air quality in Chicago. It focuses on a convenient and economic way to commute without having to own a car and to reduce vehicle miles travelled and greenhouse gas emissions.

Operations 
I-GO had cars is located in approximately 30 Chicago neighborhoods.  I-GO members reserved a vehicle online or by calling its customer service.  Members could also create and modify their reservations using smartphones. Once a reservation had been created, the member accesses the reserved car using a member card -after usage the car is returned to the same location.  Members paid a one-time fee to join, an annual renewal fee, and were then billed by the hour for their use of I-GO cars; specific rates varied depending on type of plan.  Gas and insurance were both included in I-GO's rates.  As of June 2009, I-GO had more than 12,000 members and 185 cars available for use.

The average fuel efficiency of I-GO's fleet was 35 miles per gallon, and the fleet was composed of low-emission vehicles.  Approximately 40% of the fleet were hybrid vehicles and plug-in hybrid electric vehicles.

Plug-in hybrid electric vehicles 

I-GO added the first two plug-in hybrid electric vehicles to its fleet of vehicles in April 2009 as a result of a joint effort with electricity provider ComEd.

Partnerships 
I-GO had strategic partnerships and alliances with government offices, local businesses, as well as other non-profits and independent car sharing organizations. Among others, I-GO worked closely with the Chicago Transit Authority, City of Chicago and Chicago Park District.  Businesses such as Whole Foods and Dominick's provided parking spaces dedicated to I-GO cars, and I-GO also worked with universities, including Northwestern University, University of Chicago, Loyola University Chicago, DePaul University, University of Illinois at Chicago and Illinois Institute of Technology.

History 
 2001: I-GO is created by the Center for Neighborhood Technology as the first car sharing organisation in the Chicago market
 2002: I-GO begins operations as a pilot project with six cars
 April 2005: I-GO begins its suburban expansion, placing cars in Evanston, Illinois
 August 2008: I-GO and eight other leading non-profit and independent North American car sharing organisations adopt a code of ethics to specify standards and strengthen the industry
 October 2008: I-GO membership reaches 10,000
 January 2009: I-GO establishes a joint smart card with the Chicago Transit Authority, allowing I-GO members to access CTA buses and trains using a single card
 April 2009: Two plug-in hybrid electric vehicles are added to I-GO fleet; the joint effort between I-GO and ComEd is formally recognised by Governor Quinn
 May 2013: I-GO is sold to Enterprise Holdings

See also 
Carsharing
Plug-in hybrid electric vehicles

References

External links 
 

Carsharing
Defunct organizations based in Illinois
Enterprise Holdings
Non-profit organizations based in Chicago
Organizations established in 2002
Organizations disestablished in 2013
Transport companies established in 2002
Transport companies disestablished in 2013
Plug-in hybrid vehicles
Transportation in Chicago
Defunct non-profit organizations based in the United States